Nancy Judith Álvarez (born June 3, 1976) is an Argentine triathlete who represented her country in the second Olympic triathlon at the 2004 Summer Olympics.

Born in Buenos Aires, Nancy Álvarez is a native of the Buenos Aires Province town of San Justo, the capital of La Matanza Partido. She studied public accountancy at the National University of La Matanza and has been competing in the triathlon since 1996. She became Argentina's national champion in the sport three times—in 2001, 2003 and 2004, winning at the games held in La Paz. Her final standing in the 2004 Olympic competition, however, was forty-third, with a total time of 2:21:38.66.

References
 Nancy Álvarez profile on the home website of the International Triathlon Union
 sports-reference

1976 births
Living people
Argentine female triathletes
Pan American Games competitors for Argentina
Olympic triathletes of Argentina
Triathletes at the 2003 Pan American Games
Triathletes at the 2004 Summer Olympics
Sportspeople from Buenos Aires
South American Games silver medalists for Argentina
South American Games medalists in triathlon
Competitors at the 2002 South American Games
20th-century Argentine women
21st-century Argentine women